Ernest Bernhardt is a former territorial level politician.

Bernhardt was first elected to the Northwest Territories Legislature in the 1991 Northwest Territories general election. He ran for a second term in the 1995 Northwest Territories general election but was defeated by Kelvin Ng.

In November 2009, Bernhardt was acclaimed as mayor of Kugluktuk, saying that he wished to maintain a "unified municipal council." Bernhardt will be sworn in 7 December.

References

External links
Nunavut Votes 2004 Cambridge Bay Profile

Members of the Legislative Assembly of the Northwest Territories
Living people
People from Kugluktuk
Inuit politicians
Inuit from the Northwest Territories
Mayors of Kugluktuk
Inuit from Nunavut
Year of birth missing (living people)